{{DISPLAYTITLE:C26H43NO5}}
The molecular formula C26H43NO5 (molar mass: 449.62 g/mol, exact mass: 449.3141 u) may refer to:

 Glycochenodeoxycholic acid
 Glycodeoxycholic acid